Sambahsa or Sambahsa-Mundialect is a constructed international auxiliary language (IAL) devised by French linguist Olivier Simon.
Among IALs it is categorized as a worldlang. It is based on the Proto-Indo-European language (PIE) and has a relatively complex grammar.
The language was first released on the Internet in July 2007; prior to that, the creator claims to have worked on it for eight years. According to one of the rare academic studies addressing recent auxiliary languages, "Sambahsa has an extensive vocabulary and a large amount of learning and reference material".

, on the other hand, is a fusion of  'worldwide' and  'dialect'.

Sambahsa tries to preserve the original spellings of words as much as possible and this makes its orthography complex, though still kept regular. There are four grammatical cases: nominative, accusative, dative and genitive.

Sambahsa, though based on PIE, borrows a good proportion of its vocabulary from languages such as Arabic, Chinese, Indonesian, Swahili and Turkish, which belong to various other language families.

Phonology
Sambahsa's phonology has little to do with Proto-Indo-European phonology, though the majority of its vocabulary comes from PIE.
The changes from PIE are not regular, since the creator of Sambahsa has tried to avoid homophones, which would have become common after the elimination of some PIE sounds like laryngeals or some aspirated consonants. However, any person proficient with Proto-Indo-European roots will easily recognize them when they appear in Sambahsa.
Unlike some auxlangs like Esperanto, Sambahsa does not use the "one letter = one sound" principle, nor diacritics, but instead relies on a regular and complex system that combines the 26 letters of the basic Latin alphabet. This system was chosen to preserve the recognizability of words taken from West-European languages, where orthography plays a key role. For example, according to the rules of Sambahsa, bureau is pronounced as in French, and point as in English.

Sambahsa has nine vowels (not counting the lengthened form of these vowels), two semi-vowels (IPA: [j] and [w]) and twenty consonants.  To help language learners, and because IPA symbols cannot be written with all keyboards, a special simpler system has been developed, called Sambahsa Phonetic Transcription, or SPT.

Compared to other conlangs, Sambahsa words are short, often as short as English words, and highly consonantic. This latter point is in accordance with the PIE background of Sambahsa, where roots have often a consonant-vocal-consonant structure.

Likewise, Sambahsa's accentuation rules are complex but regular, and tend to follow what is often found in German or Italian. This predictability implies that all words with the same orthography are pronounced and stressed the same way as each other. Thus, for example, while German Präsident and Italian presidente are stressed on the "ent" syllable, Sambahsa  is stressed on the "i", since  can also mean "they preside", and a final "ent" never bears the stress. This regularity of accentuation can be compared with English president and to preside, two words that bear the stress on different syllables, though they share the same origin.

Grammar

Declensions
In Sambahsa, declensions are only compulsory for pronouns. The declensions of these pronouns (demonstrative/interrogative and relative/personal) are mostly parallel, and often show similarities with their Proto-Indo-European ancestors. Thus, in all Sambahsa declensions, the neuter nominative and accusative are identical, as it was the case in PIE. There are identical forms for the relative and interrogative pronouns, as well as for the third person pronoun and the definite article (the in English).

Sambahsa has two numbers (singular and plural; the dual number of PIE has not been preserved) and four grammatical genders : masculine, feminine, neuter, and undetermined. This last gender, which is an innovation from PIE, is used when a noun of uncertain or unknown gender is referred to, and, in the plural, for groups containing elements of different genders. The creator of Sambahsa introduced this non-PIE element to avoid the "gender" dispute found in Esperanto.

Gender is attributed in Sambahsa according to the "true nature" of the noun referred to, as English speakers do with he, she and it.

Sambahsa has four grammatical cases: nominative, accusative, dative and genitive; however, their attribution tries to be as logical as possible, and not arbitrary as in many modern Indo-European languages. The nominative is the case of the subject, and the form under which words are given in dictionaries. Except for verbs describing a movement or a position (where the appropriate prepositions ought to be used), all transitive verbs must introduce the accusative case in the first place, before an eventual dative case. However, the dependent clause of indirect speech is considered as a direct object, leading to verbs introducing an indirect object, even if there is no visible direct object.

Compare :
 , 'He answers (to) me that he won't come tomorrow'
 , 'He hasn't answered (to) me'

In Sambahsa, all prepositions trigger the accusative.

The genitive indicates possession, and is used after adjectives that can introduce a dependent clause.

Compare :
 ,'I'm sure that he'll be able to do that'
  (genitive plural) , "I'm sure of his abilities".

For substantives and adjectives, there are declined "free endings" (i.e. non-compulsory) used most often in literary context for euphonics or poetry. This system is inspired by the euphonic endings (ʾiʿrāb) found in Modern Standard Arabic.

Conjugation 
Sambahsa verbs are indicated in dictionaries not under their infinitive form, but their bare stem, because the whole conjugation can be deduced from the form of this stem.
The main tenses of Sambahsa are present and
past, but many other tenses can be obtained through the use of affixes or auxiliary verbs. Sambahsa uses the following endings, which are close to those found in many Indo-European languages.

Sambahsa is unusual among auxlangs because of its use of a predictable ablaut system for the past tense and passive past participles. For example, eh within a verbal stem turns to oh. Other verbs that cannot use ablaut can drop their nasal infix, or use an improved version of the De Wahl's rules. Finally, the remaining verbs simply add the past tense endings, which are optional for verbs of the categories described above.

Therefore, this system qualifies Sambahsa as a language belonging to the Indo-European family of languages, though it remains a constructed language.

Vocabulary 

Because of its rather large vocabulary for an auxlang (as of August 2020, the full Sambahsa-English dictionary contained more than 18,000 entries), it is difficult to assess the share of each language in Sambahsa's eclectic wordstock. However, the main layers are (either reconstructed or extrapolated) Indo-European vocabulary, Greco-Roman scientific and technical vocabulary (which is not discussed below, as it is more or less comparable to what is found in English) and multiple sources extending from Western Europe to Eastern Asia.

Indo-European vocabulary 

The core of Sambahsa's vocabulary is undoubtedly of Indo-European origin. Only a few Sambahsa words can be traced back to pre-Indo-European times (like , 'chamois', cf. Basque: ahuntz). Many basic Sambahsa words are thus very close to their reconstructed Indo-European counterparts. See (Sambahsa/Proto-Indo-European): / ('hedgehog'), / ('gland'), / ('to comb'), / ('to jump'), / ('fist'), / ('weevil'), / ('to go'), / ('yew wood' in Sambahsa; 'yew' in PIE), / ('dwelling'), / ('oath'), / ('Sir, lord'). But less attested Indo-European vocabulary is found in Sambahsa too. And  ('hoe') may be a cognate of Old Church Slavonic  and English mattock.

Further development from the Indo-European background

Though Sambahsa, like any other conlang, has derivation rules, it sometimes uses backformation too.

But the suffix -it was abstracted from PIE words like  'grain of wheat' and  'grain of barley'; thus  can be understood as 'a grain of frozen snow'.

Words common to different language families

A characteristic of Sambahsa is to include words found in different language families, while the most famous auxiliary languages tend to limit themselves to a compilation of Romance vocabulary with some borrowings from the Germanic languages. For example:

  ('cupboard') has cognates both in Germanic and Slavic languages: Russian шкаф, Polish szafa, Ukrainian шафа, Danish skab, Icelandic skápur, Franconian dialect schaaf and Swedish skåp.
  ('count', as a nobility title) is a German word from Greek  that has been borrowed into many languages including Azerbaijani qraf, Bulgarian граф, Czech hrabě, Danish greve, Estonian krahv, Croatian grof, Hungarian gróf, Finnish kreivi, Lithuanian grafas, Icelandic greifi and Russian граф.
  ('mug') is found in German Becher and many other Germanic languages. It comes from Low Latin  and is at the origin of Hungarian pohár, Italian bicchiere and Romanian pahar, all meaning 'glass'.
  means 'big hall, palace' and has the same Turkish and Persian origin as English seraglio but with a meaning closer to its etymology and to Russian сарай ('barn').

The Balkan sprachbund

Though they belong to different language families, the languages spoken in Southeast Europe share a number of common grammatical features and of loanwords due to their historical background. That is why Sambahsa includes words from this region.

  ('hornless') corresponds to Romanian șut, Bulgarian/Serbo-Croatian ; also Albanian  'hornless'.
  ('pitcher') comes from Old Greek , like Serbo-Croatian путир, Russian потир, Romanian and Albanian .
  ('coating') comes from Greek κεραμίδα, which has given, among others, Romanian cărămidă ('brick') and Arabic   'tile'.

Words from Arabic and Persian

A significant part of Sambahsa's vocabulary comes from Arabic and Persian. Both languages have extensively provided loanwords to a lexical continuum ranging from the Atlantic Ocean to Indonesia because, respectively, of the spread of Islam and the brilliance of the former Persian civilization. Sambahsa learning materials often call this stratum "Muslim".

  ('assets') comes from Arabic  and is found in Turkish  ('estate') and Persian . 
  ('adultery') comes from Arabic  and is found in Persian and many other languages spoken by a majority of Muslims. 
  ('merlon') comes from Spanish adarve and Portuguese adarve from Arabic  and ultimately Persian  which has its origin in PIE *dhwer like Sambahsa  ('door').

Sinitic vocabulary

Classical Chinese has heavily influenced the wordstock of neighbouring languages, mostly Japanese, Korean and Vietnamese. As a result, Sambahsa incorporates some Sinitic vocabulary, but the phonetic differences between these various languages can be high.

  in an attempt to balance Mandarin , Japanese , Korean  et al. This word showcases some seeming flaws of the language's approach to be reminiscent of all targeted languages at once.
Not all Sambahsa Sinitic words come from Classical Chinese. The Min Nan language of Southern China provided loanwords to some South-East Asian languages, and some of these borrowings are, in turn, found in Sambahsa.

 Sambahsa  ('wonton') is an Indonesian word from Min Nan , while Mandarin Chinese (Pinyin) has 
 Likewise, Sambahsa  ('attic') comes from Min Nan  through Indonesian loteng.

Sample phrases

Literary works translated into Sambahsa

 The Songs of Bilitis by Pierre Louÿs : Ia Songvs as Bilitis
 Demian by Hermann Hesse : Demian
 The Stranger by Albert Camus : Is Gospoti
 The Little Prince by Antoine de Saint-Exupéry : Is Lytil Prince
 The Gospel of Matthew : Id Euanghelio sekwent Matyah
 Alice's Adventures in Wonderland : Ia Aventures as Alice in Daumsenland and Through the Looking-Glass published by Evertype
 The Strange Case of Doctor Jekyll and Mister Hyde : Id Stragno Fall om Doctor Jekyll ed Poti Hyde published by Evertype
 Un Coeur simple by Gustave Flaubert : Un simple kerd
 The Tower of the Elephant, The Scarlet Citadel, The Devil in Iron, A Witch Shall Be Born and Jewels of Gwahlur by Robert E. Howard : Id Tor ios Elephant, Id Scarlato Citadell, Diabel ex Sider, Gnahsiet un Yasa, Ia Dents os Gwahlur
 A Scandal in Bohemia by Arthur Conan Doyle : Un Scandal in Chekhia
 The Call of Cthulhu and the Moon-Bog by H. P. Lovecraft : Kal os Cthulhu, Luna-moor

Movies with Sambahsa subtitles

 Revelations (a fan-made movie based on Star Wars): Revelations
 The Hunt for Gollum (a fan-made prequel to the Lord of the Rings) : Sayd po Gollum
 Born of Hope (a fan-made prequel to the Lord of the Rings) : Gnaht Speh
 Home (a French movie by Yann Arthus-Bertrand about environmental threats) : Ghom
 Kaydara (a fan-made movie based on The Matrix) : Kaydara

References

External links
 Official Website of Sambahsa
 A Sambahsa English Dictionary
 Sambahsa-English dictionary on Glosbe (providing dictionaries to many other languages)
 Sambahsa-mundialect Wiki

International auxiliary languages
Constructed languages introduced in the 2000s
2007 introductions
Constructed languages